Lilium brownii is a species of lily native to Mainland China, Hong Kong, Kinmen and Matsu Islands as well as northern and central Vietnam and Kachin of Myanmar. Its common names include Hong Kong lily and Brown's lily.

Botanical varieties
There are two accepted varieties of L. brownii:

 L. brownii var. brownii: leaves lanceolate to linear, known as "wild lily" (野百合) in China.
 L. brownii var. viridulum: leaves oblanceolate to obovate, known as "(common) lily" (百合) in China. This variety is often cultivated for its edible bulbs.

References

brownii
Flora of China
Flora of Hong Kong
Flora of Vietnam
Flora of Myanmar